Joe Alexander Fillmore (March 14, 1914 – September 20, 1992), nicknamed "Fireball", was an American Negro league pitcher for the Philadelphia Stars. 

A native of Victoria, Texas, Fillmore made his Negro leagues debut for the Philadelphia Stars in 1941. He served in the United States Army in World War II. He was an ace pitcher for the integrated March Field Flyers in Riverside, California After his service, Fillmore returned to the Stars for the 1945 and 1946 seasons, then played in the Mexican League in 1947. He died in Los Angeles, California in 1992 at age 78.

References

External links
 and Seamheads
 Joe Fillmore at Negro League Baseball Players Association

1914 births
1992 deaths
Philadelphia Stars players
Baseball pitchers
People from Victoria, Texas
Baseball players from Texas
United States Army personnel of World War II
African Americans in World War II
Algodoneros de Unión Laguna players
American expatriate baseball players in Mexico
Angeles de Puebla players
Diablos Rojos del México players
Gallos de Santa Rosa players
Tecolotes de Nuevo Laredo players
African-American United States Army personnel